Kishna Ram Nai (born 1 January 1935) is an Indian politician, elected member from the Dungargarh constituency of Rajasthan three times.

Career  
Kishnaram Nai is an Indian politician and he is a three-time MLA from Sridungargarh Vidhan Sabha and has been a founding member of BJP and has also been the Chairman of Sridungargarh Municipality and has been BJP District President four times. He was Suspend from Bhartiya Janta Party in 2018. Today, Kishnaram Nai and his grandson Ashish Jariwal are doing active politics in Sridungargarh assembly constituency.

References

External links 

1935 births
Bharatiya Janata Party politicians from Rajasthan
Rajasthan MLAs 1990–1992
Rajasthan MLAs 1993–1998
Rajasthan MLAs 2013–2018
People from Bikaner district
Living people